Suárez is a town and municipality in the Tolima department of Colombia.

References

Municipalities of Tolima Department